

Manitoba

Rural Manitoba

Winnipeg

Saskatchewan

Southern Saskatchewan

Northern Saskatchewan

Alberta

Rural Alberta

Edmonton and environs

Calgary

British Columbia

BC Interior

Fraser Valley and Southern Lower Mainland

Vancouver and Northern Lower Mainland

Vancouver Island

Nunavut

Northwest Territories

Yukon

References 

2006 Canadian federal election